Amityville: No Escape is a 2016 American horror film written and directed by Henrique Couto, and co-written by Ira Gansler. It is the seventeenth film to be inspired by Jay Anson's 1977 novel The Amityville Horror. A found footage film, it follows two storylines, one set in 1997 and the other in 2016, that both involve 112 Ocean Avenue, a haunted house in Amityville, New York.

Plot 

In April 1997, a woman named Lina moves into 112 Ocean Avenue in Amityville, New York. The house is dilapidated and full of objects that were left in it by previous occupants, and as Lina works on repairing and cleaning it, she records a video diary for her absent husband, who is a soldier in the United States Army. Worsening paranormal phenomena occurs in the house, which Lina eventually learns was the site of an allegedly possession-induced familicide that was committed by Ronald DeFeo Jr. back in 1974. After a few weeks, an unseen presence attacks and kills Lina.

In August 2016, a college student named George Harris is doing a video thesis on fear, and convinces his girlfriend, Sarah, his sister, Elizabeth, and their friends Lisa and Simon to accompany him on a camping trip to the woods near 112 Ocean Avenue. On their first night in the forest, George and Elizabeth encounter a woodsman who claims to be searching for his missing daughter, while a little girl dressed all in white is glimpsed by Simon. The next night, the quintet find the woodsman disemboweled shortly after the little girl is spotted by Elizabeth. The group try to flee the woods, but become lost despite spending several hours hiking while following their compass, with all of their attempts at calling for aid proving ineffective due to a lack of cellphone service and their radio emitting nothing but distorted screeching, which traumatizes Lisa.

Simon dies while searching for the little girl, and the increasingly distraught Lisa disappears after being lured off of the path by the child, who is invisible to George. Lisa and Elizabeth are killed, and George and Sarah become separated, with the latter stumbling onto and breaking into the vacant 112 Ocean Avenue at George's insistence. George soon enters the house, and calmly shoots himself in the head in front of Sarah (whose greatest fear was being left alone).

Sarah's fate is left unknown, as the film returns to the 1997 footage, which shows Lisa, looking exactly like she did in 2016 and speaking in a distorted child's voice, touch Lina's body and say, "Tag, you're it."

Cast

Release 

The film premiered at the By-Jo Theatre in Germantown, Ohio on August 5, 2016. It was released on DVD by Camp Motion Pictures on June 13, 2017.

Reception 

Famous Monsters of Filmland gave the film a glowingly positive review, writing, "If you are a fan of the franchise (in particular the first flick, natch) or just want to see something fresh in the found-footage fright-flick arena, I urge you to give Amityville: No Escape the attention of your putrid peepers. It is a brisk, traditional terror tale told in a fun and innovative way!" In contrast, Tex Hula ranked Amityville: No Escape as the third worst of the twenty-one Amityville films that he reviewed for Ain't It Cool News, and bluntly opined that its ending was "lame" and that the time that he spent watching it was "an hour and a half of life wasted." Fellow Ain't It Cool News reviewer M. L. Miller had a more lenient response to the film, writing, "There are some lulls in the present day stuff; some iffy motivations and decisions of the kids in the woods, some woods scenes that feel like the crew is just walking though a backyard that hasn’t been mowed for a week, and an open ending that really doesn't make a while lot of sense, but does register as creepy. The past stuff in Amityville: No Escape is actually pretty haunting in its simplicity and strong performance by Julia Gomez."

References

External links 

 

2016 films
2016 horror films
2016 independent films
2010s American films
2010s English-language films
2010s exploitation films
2010s ghost films
2010s psychological horror films
2010s supernatural horror films
American exploitation films
American ghost films
American haunted house films
American independent films
American psychological horror films
American supernatural horror films
Amityville Horror films
Camcorder films
Films about couples
Films about fear
Films about mass murder
Films about missing people
Films about siblings
Films about spirit possession
Films about time travel
Films set in 1997
Films set in 2016
Films set in abandoned houses
Films set in forests
Films set in Long Island
Films set in New York (state)
Films shot in Ohio
Found footage films
Unofficial sequel films